"L.A. 2017" is a 1971 episode of the NBC television series The Name of the Game. Sometimes referred to as "Los Angeles: AD 2017" (the name of Philip Wylie's subsequent novel based on his script) or "Los Angeles 2017", it is a science fiction piece, shot for $375,000. The director, the 24-year-old Steven Spielberg, used camera angles to drive his first movie-length television episode across and remarked in later years that the show "opened a lot of doors for me".

This is the sixteenth episode of the third season, and the cast includes Barry Sullivan, Edmond O'Brien, and (in a brief cameo) Spielberg's friend Joan Crawford. The episode is 76 minutes long (90 minutes including commercials). The episode has never been released on home video, neither as a stand-alone film, nor as a part of the series. Presenting the story as a dream was the only way that Wylie's science fiction tale could be fitted into the peculiar format of The Name of the Game, a show about the magazine business set in the present and rotating between Gene Barry, Tony Franciosa, and Robert Stack (and in the third season also featuring Peter Falk, Robert Wagner, and Robert Culp).

Plot
A publisher, Glenn Howard (Gene Barry), while driving and dictating a memo to the President regarding the saving of the environment, finds himself suddenly plunged 46 years into the future only to learn that the people of Los Angeles are living underground to escape the pollution which has made living on the surface no longer possible.  A fascist America is run like a corporation with a number of vice-presidents. The police department of the subterranean Los Angeles is led/managed by psychiatrists.  His identity is discovered and he's asked to join the government by re-starting his publication as propaganda.  He considers, then refuses when he discovers that the corporations are still emitting pollutants into the air, further destroying the atmosphere. 

At the end, Howard wakes up to discover it was all a dream—apparently he passed out in his car from carbon monoxide inhalation from the dash vents.  A police officer had just administered oxygen and after he came to, was asked if he was okay and able to drive.  He replied in the affirmative,  starting his Chrysler 300 which spews exhaust out the tailpipe.  As he drives away there is a chilling final image of a dead bird that hints at a troubled future ahead.

Cast

Gene Barry as Glenn Howard
Barry Sullivan as Dane Bigelow
Edmond O'Brien as Bergman
Severn Darden as Cameron
Paul Stewart as Dr. Rubias
Alicia Bond as Dr. Barton
Regis Cordic as Chairman
Joan Crawford as Board member
Walt Davis as technician
Sharon Farrell as Sandrelle

Michael C. Gwynne as Dr. Parker
Steven Karpf as Karpf
Louise Latham as Helen Bigelow
Geoffrey Lewis as Bates
Sarah Lord as technician
Gloria Manon as Dr. Arnold
Phil Montgomery as Keeger
Stuart Nisbet as Dr. Simmons
Jason Wingreen as Hammond

External links

1971 American television episodes
Works by Steven Spielberg
Fiction set in 2017
Television episodes set in Los Angeles